Cleethorpes was a non-metropolitan district in Humberside, England. It was abolished on 1 April 1996 and replaced by North East Lincolnshire.

Political control
The first election to the council was held in 1973, initially operating as a shadow authority before coming into its powers on 1 April 1974. Political control of the council from 1973 until its abolition in 1996 saw the council always under no overall control:

Council elections
1973 Cleethorpes District Council election
1976 Cleethorpes Borough Council election
1979 Cleethorpes Borough Council election (New ward boundaries)
1983 Cleethorpes Borough Council election
1987 Cleethorpes Borough Council election
1991 Cleethorpes Borough Council election

Borough result maps

By-election results

References

External links

 
Cleethorpes
Council elections in Humberside
District council elections in England
Humberside